Smitha Harikrishna (born 6 November 1973 in Bangalore, Karnataka) is a former One Day International cricketer who represented India. She is a right-hand batsman and bowls right-arm medium pace. She has played 22 ODIs for India and scored 231 runs and took 8 wickets.

In July 2007, Harikrishna coached the United Arab Emirates women's national team at its debut international tournament, the 2007 ACC Women's Tournament. The team lost all three of its matches.

References

1973 births
Air India women cricketers
Cricketers from Bangalore
India women One Day International cricketers
Indian cricket coaches
Indian women cricketers
Living people
Sportswomen from Karnataka